Juan Martín García (February 18, 1980 – October 6, 2015) was a Texas man who was executed for capital murder.

On September 17, 1998, Garcia attempted to rob Hugo Solano, a 36-year old Christian missionary from Guadalajara, Mexico who had moved to Houston to provide a U.S. education for his children. Garcia, a U.S. citizen, was of Salvadoran descent, and his native county was Harris County. Garcia, a gang member, had a history of criminal activity involving assault, making a "terroristic threat" towards a teacher, theft, and trespassing.

Garcia, with three other men, did the robbery attempt at an apartment complex at the 17000 block of Cali in unincorporated Harris County. He shot Solano three times after Solano refused to give him his wallet and received $8. García said that he shot Solano out of panic.

Garcia, Texas Department of Criminal Justice (TDCJ)#999360, arrived on death row on June 21, 2000. While on death row he was in Polunsky Unit. He was executed at Huntsville Unit, on October 6, 2015. Garcia apologized to Ana Solano, Garcia's widow, and her daughter before he was executed. He was the 11th death row prisoner to be executed in Texas in 2015.

See also
 List of people executed in Texas, 2010–2019
 List of people executed in the United States in 2015

References

1980 births
2015 deaths
1998 murders in the United States
American people executed for murder
People from Houston
21st-century executions by Texas
People executed by Texas by lethal injection
People convicted of murder by Texas
American people of Salvadoran descent